Alice Mizzau (born 18 March 1993) is an Italian competitive swimmer who competes primarily in freestyle events.

She won the first gold medal of all-time, of an Italian women relay team, at an international swimming championships 2012 European Aquatics Championships with the 4 × 200 m freestyle.

Biography
Alice Mizzau qualified for her first Olympic appearance at the 2012 Summer Olympics in London.

Achievements

See also
Italy at the 2012 Summer Olympics - Swimming

References

External links
 
 Swimmer profile at Federnuoto website

1993 births
Living people
Italian female freestyle swimmers
Olympic swimmers of Italy
Swimmers at the 2012 Summer Olympics
Swimmers at the 2016 Summer Olympics
European Aquatics Championships medalists in swimming
World Aquatics Championships medalists in swimming
Medalists at the FINA World Swimming Championships (25 m)
Swimmers at the 2022 Mediterranean Games
Mediterranean Games medalists in swimming
Mediterranean Games silver medalists for Italy
Mediterranean Games bronze medalists for Italy
20th-century Italian women
21st-century Italian women